Hereditary Count John Ernest of Nassau-Siegen (21 October 1582Jul. – 16/17 September 1617Jul.), official titles: Graf zu Nassau, Katzenelnbogen, Vianden und Diez, Herr zu Beilstein, was since 1607 Hereditary Count of Nassau-Siegen, a part of the County of Nassau. He came from the House of Nassau-Siegen, a cadet branch of the Ottonian Line of the House of Nassau. He first served as an officer in the Dutch States Army and later as general in the Republic of Venice during the Uskok War.

Biography

John Ernest studied in Kassel in 1595, and then in Geneva. He later stayed with his uncle William Louis in Leeuwarden.

In the Dutch States Army
John Ernest served in the Dutch States Army under Maurice of Nassau since 1601, where he took part in the Siege of Ostend. Later, he served as a hopman in the regiment of his uncle Ernest Casimir. From May to July 1603 he took part in the special envoy to London to congratulate King James I of England on his accession to the throne. The envoy also included Frederick Henry of Nassau, grand pensionary Johan van Oldenbarnevelt, Walraven III van Brederode and the regent Jacob Valcke from Zeeland. At the first audience, a comical misunderstanding occurred when John Ernest was mistaken for Frederick Henry by James I. John Ernest was appointed captain on 22 September 1603. At the Siege of Sluis in 1604 he was shot in the leg. On 6 May 1606 he was appointed colonel of the regiment Walloons.

John Ernest and his younger brothers Adolf and John ‘the Younger’ had the reputation of being gamblers and of showing a completely unseemly splendour in their clothes and appearance. Their father wrote letters to the young counts, full of fatherly admonitions, exhorting them to be thrifty, because he did not know what to do with his worries and debts. In a letter of 8 December 1608 he even considered the death of Adolf as a punishment from God and he exhorted the two others, who with ‘einem ärgerlichen Leben mit Verschwendung fast allem, was ich in der Welt habe, durch Ehebrechen und Hurerei, Plünderung und Beraubung armer, unschuldiger Leute hoch und niederen Standen’ (‘an annoying life of squandering almost everything I have in the world, through adultery and fornication, plundering and robbing poor, innocent people of high and low rank’) ruined the county of Nassau-Siegen, to lead a different, better life, worthy of the name Nassau.

John Ernest took part in the Siege of Jülich in 1610 with Maurice of Nassau, where he was appointed second-in-command. In 1615 he took part in Frederick Henry of Nassau’s march to the Hansa city of Brunswick, which was in conflict with Duke Frederick Ulrich of Brunswick-Wolfenbüttel and besieged by him. The Dutch States Army crossed neutral territory – especially the Bishopric of Münster – to relieve the besieged city. John Ernest’s father then managed to negotiate an agreement between the Duke and the city.

Hereditary Count of Nassau-Siegen

When his grandfather Count John VI ‘the Elder’ of Nassau-Siegen died on 8 October 1606, he was succeeded by John Ernest’s father together with his brothers William Louis, George, Ernest Casimir and John Louis. On 30 March 1607 these brothers divided their possessions. John ‘the Middle’ acquired Siegen, Freudenberg, Netphen, Hilchenbach,  and the Haingericht. The brothers then also signed an succession treaty. By this agreement the heirs of the brothers were explicitly forbidden to convert to a religion other than the Reformed confession. Since the partition, John ‘the Middle’ has had his Residenz in Siegen Castle, which he had renovated around that time. Because the county of Nassau-Siegen was such a small country (it had about 9.000 inhabitants and yielded about 13.000 guilders annually) John ‘the Middle’ decided that the county should not be divided up again. To avoid this, on 8 April 1607 he made a will and testament, which stated that only the eldest son would rule, and the other children should be compensated with money or offices. Thus, John Ernest became the heir of Nassau-Siegen. With his father, his brother John ‘the Younger’ and his uncle George of Nassau-Beilstein, John Ernest was present at the coronation of Roman King Matthias in Frankfurt in 1612.

In the service of the Venetian Republic

The signing of the Twelve Years’ Truce and the end of the War of the Jülich Succession deprived John Ernest of the opportunity to distinguish himself further. In 1616 the Republic of Venice under Doge Giovanni Bembo requested assistance from the States General of the Netherlands in its struggle with Archduke Ferdinand of Inner Austria over the borders of Istria and Friuli and the protection which Ferdinand granted to the Uskoks, notorious pirates in the Adriatic Sea. The request concerned foot soldiers and cavalry. John Ernest obtained permission from the States General in a resolution of 3 October 1616 to enter the service of the Venetian Republic with a regiment of foot soldiers. The permission concerned a leave of absence from State service for one year to enable him to take command of 3,000 men.

On 2 March 1617, John Ernest, at the head of his soldiers, left the shipstead of Texel and, after a prosperous journey, arrived in Venice on 4 April. There John Ernest was received with joy. The Doge of Venice had previously granted him the rank and title of General of the Dutch Armed Forces.

John Ernest arrived with his troops at Gradisca, a small but strong Austrian town in the County of Gorizia, on the River Isonzo, which had been besieged in vain by the Venetians for a long time. Initially, two enemy sconces were conquered by the Dutch, but when John Ernest wanted to take advantage of the terror of the besieged, the commander of the Venetians prevented him from doing so. John Ernest remained with his troops before Gradisca, and no doubt this city would have collapsed if the peace had not been signed shortly before. John Ernest did not live to see the signing of the peace; he died shortly before in Udine of dysentery. The auxiliary army of John Ernest and also the troops of some other Dutch leaders dwindled away in a few years. The leaders were involved in conflicts or died. In the years 1619 and 1620, many of the survivors returned to the homeland.

Death, burial and reburial
John Ernest died in Udine in the night of 16/17 September 1617Jul.. His body was embalmed, and taken in a coach to Venice. There, his father had planned the construction of a dignified burial vault for the dynasty he founded. For this, there are remarkable notes in Latin, partly in elegiac couplets, for a projected memorial and burial place of the sovereign family, from the time around 1620, with the names of all 25 children from his two marriages, also with details of birth, marriage and death of his relatives. Since the project was not carried out, the burials of the members of the sovereign family between 1607 and 1658 took place in the inadequate burial vault under the choir of the mentioned parish church.

Ancestors

Notes

References

Sources
 
 
 
  (1911). "Johan Ernst I". In:  en  (redactie), Nieuw Nederlandsch Biografisch Woordenboek (in Dutch). Vol. Eerste deel. Leiden: A.W. Sijthoff. p. 1222.
 
 
 
 
 
 
 
 
 
 
 
  (2004). "Die Fürstengruft zu Siegen und die darin von 1669 bis 1781 erfolgten Beisetzungen". In:  u.a. (Redaktion), Siegener Beiträge. Jahrbuch für regionale Geschichte (in German). Vol. 9. Siegen: Geschichtswerkstatt Siegen – Arbeitskreis für Regionalgeschichte e.V. p. 183–202.
 
 
  (1979). "Genealogische gegevens". In:  (red.), Nassau en Oranje in de Nederlandse geschiedenis (in Dutch). Alphen aan den Rijn: A.W. Sijthoff. p. 40–44, 224–228. .
 
  (1882). Het vorstenhuis Oranje-Nassau. Van de vroegste tijden tot heden (in Dutch). Leiden: A.W. Sijthoff/Utrecht: J.L. Beijers.

External links

 Nassau. In: Medieval Lands. A prosopography of medieval European noble and royal families, compiled by Charles Cawley.
 Nassau Part 5. In: An Online Gotha, by Paul Theroff.

1582 births
1617 deaths
German Calvinist and Reformed Christians
German generals
German military officers
German people of the Eighty Years' War
John Ernest of Nassau-Siegen
Military personnel of the Eighty Years' War
Military personnel from Siegen
16th-century German people
17th-century German military personnel